Ivy Thomas Memorial School is a private bilingual school in Montevideo, Uruguay. Ivy Thomas was founded in 1959 by teacher Elizabeth Thompson de Borrás, who named it after her mother, director of the Windsor School. It offers both primary and secondary education and is based predominantly in the neighbourhood of Pocitos.

Profile
The school places much importance on developing English language ability and is one of the better known private institutions in Uruguay, though considered less prestigious than The British Schools of Montevideo and the Uruguayan American School. In 2013, Ivy Thomas, inspired by the Steve Jobs schools in The Netherlands, introduced iPads to classroom teaching.

Like a number of other private schools in Montevideo and Punta Del Este, it has seen increased demand due to an influx of expatriates from Argentina looking to escape the tax regime in their country. In 2018, Ivy Thomas opened a second site outside Montevideo in Camino de los Horneros.

Alumni

Notes

References

Schools in Montevideo
Private schools in Uruguay
Educational institutions established in 1959

External links
 Official website